Leptothorax is a genus of small ants with mainly Holarctic distributions. The genus is notable for its widespread social parasitism, i.e. they are dependent on the help of workers from other ant species during a part or the whole of their life cycles.

Closely related genera are Cardiocondyla, Stereomyrmex and Romblonella.

Species

Leptothorax acervorum (Fabricius, 1793)
Leptothorax acervorum vandeli (Bondroit, 1920)
Leptothorax athabasca Buschinger & Schulz, 2008
Leptothorax buschingeri Kutter, 1967
Leptothorax calderoni Creighton, 1950
Leptothorax crassipilis Wheeler, 1917
Leptothorax faberi Buschinger, 1983
Leptothorax goesswaldi Kutter, 1967
Leptothorax gredleri Mayr, 1855
Leptothorax kutteri Buschinger, 1966
Leptothorax muscorum (Nylander, 1846)
Leptothorax muscorum uvicensis Blacker, 1992
Leptothorax oceanicus (Kuznetsov-Ugamsky, 1928)
Leptothorax pacis (Kutter, 1945)
Leptothorax paraxenus Heinze & Alloway, 1992
Leptothorax pocahontas (Buschinger, 1979)
Leptothorax retractus Francoeur, 1986
Leptothorax scamni Ruzsky, 1905
Leptothorax sphagnicola Francoeur, 1986
Leptothorax wilsoni Heinze, 1989
Leptothorax zhengi Zhou & Chen, 2011

References

 
Ant genera
Taxa named by Gustav Mayr
Taxonomy articles created by Polbot